Beach volleyball, for the 2013 Island Games, took place at the National Sports Center (North Field) in Devonshire Parish. Competition took place from 13 to 17 July 2013.

Medal table

Events

Group stage

Men

Pool C

|}

References

2013 Island Games
2013 in beach volleyball